Petru Gherghel (born 28 June 1940) is a Romanian prelate of the Catholic Church. He is the ninth Bishop of Iași, from 1990 to 2019. He was formerly served as apostolic administrator of the same diocese from 1978 to 1990, under the Communist regime. 

Gherghel was born in Gherăești, Neamț County. A graduate of the Roman Catholic Theological Institute of Iași, he was ordained to the priesthood in Alba Iulia on 29 June 1965 by Bishop Áron Márton. He then served at the parish in Barticești until 1967, followed by a period in Rădăuți. On 1 December 1970, he was named a professor at his alma mater, rising to director in March 1975.

On 21 February 1978, Pope Paul VI named him apostolic administrator, with his installation taking place on 4 April. During the following twelve years, a number of churches were built and parishes opened in the diocese, as well as a new seminary building; nearly 150 priests were ordained, with some of them being sent abroad to study. On 14 March 1990, Pope John Paul II raised Gherghel to the rank of bishop, with his consecration taking place on May 1 at the seminary, officiated by Archbishop Angelo Sodano, a representative of the Pope.

On 6 July 2019, Pope Francis accepted his resignation, and appointed  as his successor.

Notes

1940 births
Living people
People from Neamț County
20th-century Roman Catholic bishops in Romania
21st-century Roman Catholic bishops in Romania